The Chandan River flows near the city of Bhagalpur in the state of Bihar, India. It has been identified as probably being the river Champa on whose banks was located the ancient city of Champa, capital of the Anga mahajanapada. It would have then also been a border between Anga and its neighbour, Magadha.

References

Rivers of India